Jordan Alexander Callahan (born October 21, 1990) is an American professional basketball player who plays for Esgueira of the Portuguese Basketball League. Standing at 1.84 m (6 ft in), he mainly plays at the point guard position.

College career
Callahan played college basketball for Tulane University. He left the school as its all-time leader in 3-pointers made. In 120 games, he scored 1,269 points and had 304 assists.

Professional career
In 2013 he signed with Kotwica Kolobrezeg Kotwica Kołobrzeg.

In July 2015, Callahan signed with Crailsheim Merlins of the German Basketball Bundesliga. In the 2015–16 season, he averaged 11.4 points and 4.4 assists per game with Crailsheim.

On February 21, 2017, Callahan signed with Russian side Parma of the VTB United League. He played eight games with Parma, averaging 5.6 points and 2.6 assists per game.

On January 10, 2018, Callahan signed with Bulgarian club BC Balkan Botevgrad.

On July 19, 2018, Callahan signed a one-year deal with Donar, defending champions of the Dutch Basketball League (DBL). In November 2018, Donar released Callahan. 

On December 2, 2018, Callahan signed with Peristeri of the Greek Basket League. 

On December 24, 2019, after a small stint with Balkan Botevgrad in Bulgaria, Callahan returned to Greece for Ionikos Nikaias.

On March 10, 2020, Callahan received a four-year ban from FIBA competitions after a 2019 doping control test came back positive.

On November 4, 2020, Callahan signed with Pelister of the Macedonian First League.

Personal life
On July 25, 2016, Callahan had an altercation with former Washington Wizards player Glen Rice Jr. in a parking lot of a Kroger grocery store where they had arrived together in Rice's car. Callahan suffered a broken jaw and lost a tooth. Rice Jr. fled the scene on foot with two bags from his car, but was arrested later that day. The two bags, containing an AK-47 assault rifle and a Taurus .38 special, were found hidden underneath nearby leaves.

Honors
All-Basketball Bundesliga Honorable Mention – Eurobasket.com: 2014–15

References

External links
Basketball Champions League profile
Profile at realgm.com
Tulane Green Wave bio

1990 births
Living people
Al-Gharafa SC basketball players
American expatriate basketball people in Belgium
American expatriate basketball people in Bulgaria
American expatriate basketball people in Germany
American expatriate basketball people in Poland
American expatriate basketball people in Qatar
American expatriate basketball people in Russia
American men's basketball players
Antwerp Giants players
Basketball players from Atlanta
BC Balkan Botevgrad players
Crailsheim Merlins players
Donar (basketball club) players
Dutch Basketball League players
Ionikos Nikaias B.C. players
KK Włocławek players
Parma Basket players
Point guards
Rosa Radom players
SKK Kotwica Kołobrzeg players
Tulane Green Wave men's basketball players